Noémie Happart (born 1 June 1993) is a Belgian model and beauty pageant titleholder who was crowned Miss Belgium 2013. She represented her country at Miss Universe 2013 and Miss World 2013.

Miss Belgium 2013
Noemie Happart, then a student at University of Liège, entered the Miss Belgium pageant with the title Miss Liège. As winner she was crowned Miss Belgium 2013 by Laura Beyne (Miss Belgium 2012) at the grand finale in Knokke Casino on the evening of Sunday 6 January 2013.

Personal life
As the girlfriend, and later wife, of the professional footballer Yannick Carrasco, Happart gained further media attention as a "WAG". Carrasco celebrated his goal in the 2016 UEFA Champions League Final by running into the crowd to kiss her, leading to international tabloid attention. The couple married in June 2017, with Happart accompanying her husband to China when he transferred to Dalian Yifang in 2018. There is an ongoing widespread false rumor they divorced in 2020.

References

External links
Profile at Miss Belgium website (in Dutch)

1993 births
Living people
Belgian beauty pageant winners
Miss Universe 2013 contestants
University of Liège alumni
Miss World 2013 delegates
Belgian female models
Miss Belgium winners